An Outcast Among Outcasts is a 1912 American short silent drama film directed by D. W. Griffith and Wilfred Lucas. It was Lucas' debut film as a director. The film starred Blanche Sweet.

Cast
 Frank Opperman as The Blanket Tramp
 Blanche Sweet as The Young Woman
 W. Chrystie Miller as The Postmaster
 Charles West as The Station Master
 Kate Toncray as A Homemaker
 Dorothy Bernard
 William A. Carroll as A Tramp
 J. Jiquel Lanoe as A Factory Manager
 David Miles
 W. C. Robinson as A Tramp

See also
 D. W. Griffith filmography
 Blanche Sweet filmography

References

External links

1912 films
American silent short films
American black-and-white films
1912 drama films
1912 short films
Films directed by D. W. Griffith
Films directed by Wilfred Lucas

Silent American drama films
1912 directorial debut films
1910s American films